Wright's Field in Alpine is a 230-acre nature reserve in Alpine, California.  The property was purchased in 1990 by Back Country Land Trust.

The ecosystems found in Wright's Field include native grassland, Engelmann oak woodland, riparian (streamside) habitat, vernal pools, and coastal sage scrub/chaparral. Native and nonnative plants found in Wright's Field include sunflowers, buckwheat, sugarbush, canchalagua, wallflowers and Engelmann oak trees among others. Special wildlife in this field are the Hermes copper butterfly and the Quino checkerspot butterfly. Also, a conservation project for the rare plant, thornmint, is currently being held in this field with successful amounts of progress and research.

References 

Back Country Land Trust
Wrights Field Facebook site

Protected areas of San Diego County, California
Nature reserves in California